Cornești is a village in Ungheni District, in central Moldova, with a population of 2,038 at the 2004 census.

References

Villages of Ungheni District